The Tribune de Genève (English: Geneva Tribune) is a Swiss French-language, regional daily newspaper, published in Berliner format by Edipresse in Geneva.

History and operations

The Tribune de Genève was first published by James T. Bates on 1 February 1879. The paper is headquartered in Geneva.

The circulation of the Tribune de Genève was 67,151 copies in 2006. The newspaper had a circulation of 67,151 copies and a readership of 175,000 . In 2009 the circulation of the paper was 56,333 copies.

It shares some of its content with 24 heures (English: 24 Hours), Edipresse's regional newspaper for the Canton of Vaud.

See also
 List of newspapers in Switzerland
 List of non-English newspapers with English-language subsections

References

External links
 tdg.ch (in French), the newspaper's official website

1879 establishments in Switzerland
Daily newspapers published in Switzerland
French-language newspapers published in Switzerland
Newspapers published in Geneva
Newspapers established in 1879